The 2013 IMT-GT Cup or IMT-GT Friendship Football 2013  was invited association football tournament that featured six teams and was staged on 23 September 2013 to 29 September 2013 in Satun, Thailand. T

he competition was organised and promoted by Indonesia–Malaysia–Thailand Growth Triangle (IMT-GT) under Thailand, ministry of sports and tourism with ASEAN Football Federation (ASEAN) collaboration. The champion, Kedah FA defeated Songkhla United FC in the final 2–1.

Winners

See also
IMT-GT
ASEAN

References

ASEAN sports events
Malaysia–Thailand relations
Indonesia–Malaysia relations
Indonesia–Thailand relations
2013 in Thai football